Lyckeby BTK is a table tennis club in Lyckeby in Karlskrona, Sweden. Established on 16 December 1946, the club won the Swedish national women's team championship in 1994 and 1997. Up to 1995, the club was known as Lösens BTK.

References

External links
Official website 

1946 establishments in Sweden
Sport in Karlskrona
Sports clubs established in 1946
Table tennis clubs in Sweden